Rabbi Sidney Brichto (21 July 1936 – 16 January 2009) was a British Liberal rabbi. He was born in Philadelphia into an immigrant Orthodox Jewish family. As an adolescent, he began to reject religious orthodoxy in favor of Liberal Judaism. He studied in New York City, before being ordained in 1961. The same year he moved to England to do post-graduate work at University College London and also became Associate Minister of the Liberal Jewish Synagogue in St John's Wood. In 1964 he became the first executive director of (as it was then) the Union of Liberal and Progressive Synagogues, now known as Liberal Judaism.

Brichto was also a prolific author, having written extensively in the Jewish and national press.
One of his last projects, called The People's Bible, was the publishing of a series of new translations of the Bible, both the Old and New Testaments.  Rabbi Brichto believed that the concept of God is more important than questions of His existence. Equally, the Bible is relevant not because of the veracity of its stories, but because of the morality of its myths. His translations aimed to achieve accessibility as literature, and to do this, he controversially added sections to improve readability and removed large areas of non-consequential material to the appendices.

His published works included:
The New Testament (A new translation and modern explanation)
Genesis (the book of Genesis)
The Conquest of Canaan (the books of Judges and Joshua)
Samuel (the two Books of Samuel)
Song of Songs (the books The Song of Songs, Ruth, Lamentations, Ecclesiastes and Esther)
St. Luke & The Apostles (the Gospel of Luke and Acts of the Apostles)
The Genius of Paul (the letters of Paul)
Moses (divided into Book 1: Moses, Man of Godand Book 2: The Laws of Moses) (the books of Exodus, Leviticus, Numbers and Deuteronomy)
Apocalypse (Gospel of John and Book of Revelation)

Rabbi Brichto also wrote a guide to Jews and Jewish life, Funny ... you don't look Jewish in which he explored, among other things, anti-Jewish prejudices against the reality of Jewish culture and life.

His autobiography, Ritual Slaughter: Growing Up Jewish in America, provided detailed information of Rabbi Brichto's upbringing and move away from Orthodoxy.

He was married to Cathryn and had a daughter and three sons.

References
Rabbi Dr Brichto's own website provides information about much of the above.

Notes

External links
 Obituary, The Times, 20 February 2009
 

1936 births
2009 deaths
Alumni of University College London
American emigrants to England
British Liberal rabbis
Rabbis from Philadelphia
English Jewish writers
Jewish translators of the Bible
20th-century translators
20th-century English rabbis